More Rubbish is the sixth studio album by Michael Carr's comedy character Buddy Goode. It was released on 16 December 2016 both digitally and on CD.

The album was launched at the Rooty Hill RSL on 17 December 2016.

On 4 October 2017, it was announced that the album had been nominated for the Best Comedy Release category at the 2017 ARIA Awards. However, it lost to John Clarke's album Clarke's Classics.

Track listing

References

External links
Official Website
CD Edition
iTunes Edition

2016 albums
Buddy Goode albums